Bridgeport, California is a census-designated place in Mono County.

Bridgeport, California may also refer to:
 Bridgeport, Mariposa County, California
 Bridgeport, Mendocino County, California
 Bridgeport, Nevada County, California
 Bridgeville, California, formerly Bridgeport, in Humboldt County